Brian Joseph Donnelly (March 2, 1946 – February 28, 2023) was an American diplomat and politician. He was a Democratic member of the U.S. House of Representatives from Massachusetts from 1979 to 1993, and was the United States Ambassador to Trinidad and Tobago from 1994 to 1997.

Political career
Donnelly was a member of the Massachusetts House of Representatives, 1973–1978, where he served as assistant majority leader in 1977–1978.

Donnelly was elected as a Democrat to the 96th and to the six succeeding U.S. Congresses (January 3, 1979 – January 3, 1993), but was not a candidate for renomination in 1992 to the 103rd Congress.  While in Congress, Donnelly served on the Committee on Public Works and Transportation and, beginning in 1985, on the Ways and Means committee.

During his tenure in Congress, Donnelly authored, along with Republican Congressman Bill Archer of Texas, legislation to repeal the Medicare Catastrophic Coverage Act of 1988 (Pub. L. 100-360) after the law became politically unsustainable. The law's political unsustainability reached its peak when the chairman of the committee that drafted the law was chased from his district office by angry senior citizens protesting it. The enactment of the Donnelly legislation restored the Medicare program to its pre-1988 status.

Donnelly's second major accomplishment in Congress was the enactment of the so-called "Donnelly Visa" program, which authorized 5,000 visas annually for citizens of countries that had been historically under-represented in the United States' immigration system that primarily relies on family reunification. The primary beneficiaries of the Donnelly Visa program, in its early years, were Irish nationals – many of whose families lived in Donnelly's South Boston district. Congress reauthorized the program in 1990; today, it is known as the Diversity Visa (DV) program and authorizes 50,000 visas annually to nationals of countries statistically deemed under-represented in the current immigration system. Donnelly's original intent was for the program to benefit Irish nationals but the reach of the program is far broader today.

As a Knight of Columbus, he helped defeat an effort to tax fraternal insurance companies which would have diminished their ability to make charitable contributions.

In 1994, he was named United States Ambassador to Trinidad and Tobago. He served in this capacity until 1997. In 1998, he ran for Governor of Massachusetts, finishing third in the Democratic primary behind state Attorney General Scott Harshbarger and former state Senator Patricia McGovern.

Personal life
Donnelly attended private schools in Suffolk County. He graduated from Catholic Memorial High School in West Roxbury, in 1963.  He received a Bachelor of Science from Boston University in 1970.  He was a teacher and coach in the Boston public schools. Donnelly and his wife, Virginia, had two children.

Donnelly died from cancer at his home in East Dennis, Massachusetts, on February 28, 2023, just two days short of turning 77.

References

Works cited

External links
 
 

1946 births
2023 deaths
20th-century American politicians
Ambassadors of the United States to Trinidad and Tobago
Boston University alumni
Catholic Memorial School alumni
Catholics from Massachusetts
Deaths from cancer in Massachusetts
Democratic Party members of the Massachusetts House of Representatives
Democratic Party members of the United States House of Representatives from Massachusetts
People from Dennis, Massachusetts
Politicians from Boston